El Mariachi is a 1992 Spanish language American independent neo-Western action film and the first part of the saga that came to be known as Robert Rodriguez's Mexico Trilogy. It marked the feature-length debut of Rodriguez as writer and director. The Spanish language film was shot with a mainly amateur cast in the northern Mexican border town of Ciudad Acuña, Coahuila, Mexico across from Del Rio, Texas, the home town of leading actor Carlos Gallardo as the title character. The US$7,225 production was originally intended for the Mexican home-video market, but executives at Columbia Pictures liked the film and bought the American distribution rights. Columbia eventually spent $200,000 to transfer the print to film, to remix the sound, and on other post-production work, then spent millions more on marketing and distribution.

The success of Rodriguez's directorial debut led him to create two sequels (Desperado and Once Upon a Time in Mexico) with Antonio Banderas taking over from Gallardo for the character, though Gallardo co-produced both films and had a minor role in Desperado.

In 2011, El Mariachi was selected by the Library of Congress for preservation in the United States National Film Registry for being "culturally, historically, or aesthetically significant". The film is also recognized by Guinness World Records as the lowest-budgeted film ever to gross $1 million at the box office.

Plot
After breaking out of jail in a small Mexican town, a ruthless criminal, nicknamed Azul, ventures off with a guitar case full of weapons and vows revenge on the local drug lord, Moco, who had him arrested in the first place. Meanwhile, a young musician arrives in town carrying his own guitar case which contains his signature guitar. He hopes to find work in the town in order to pursue his dream of becoming a mariachi like his father.

From the confines of his heavily guarded villa on the outskirts of town, Moco sends a large group of hitmen to kill Azul. They are told to look for a man who is wearing black and carrying a guitar case, but because the Mariachi also matches this description, the hitmen mistake him for Azul and start pursuing him. Only Moco, however, knows Azul's actual face. The Mariachi is then forced to kill four of the attackers in self-defense after being chased through the streets. As the Mariachi seeks refuge in a bar owned by a beautiful woman named Dominó, he quickly falls in love with her. Unfortunately, Moco is not only financing the bar, but also has his own romantic interest in Dominó.

When Azul visits the bar for a beer and information about Moco, he accidentally leaves with the Mariachi's guitar case. Moco's thugs capture Azul on the street but release him when they learn that the case he is carrying contains only a guitar. A short time later, the Mariachi is captured and taken to Moco, who identifies him as the wrong man and sets him free.

Meanwhile, Azul, who has no directions to Moco's home, takes Dominó with him and orders her to take him to Moco's, or Moco will kill the mariachi. Dominó agrees to save the Mariachi's life. When they arrive at Moco's gated compound, Azul pretends to take Dominó hostage in order to gain entry. Moco soon realizes that Dominó has fallen for the Mariachi and, in a fit of rage, shoots both her and Azul. Suddenly, the Mariachi arrives to find the woman he loves gunned down. Moco then shoots the Mariachi's left hand, rendering him useless as a guitar player, and proceeds to taunt and laugh at the Mariachi. Overcome with grief and rage, the Mariachi picks up Azul's gun with his right hand and kills Moco, avenging Dominó's death. Moco's surviving henchmen, seeing their leader dead, walk off carelessly and leave Moco's body and the wounded Mariachi behind.

The Mariachi leaves the town on Dominó's motorbike, taking her pit bull and her letter-opener as mementos of her. His dreams to become a mariachi have been shattered, and his only protection for his future are Azul's former weapons, which he takes along in the guitar case. He rides off into the sunset.

Cast
 Carlos Gallardo as "El Mariachi"
 Consuelo Gómez as Dominó
 Peter Marquardt as Mauricio "Moco"
 Reinol Martínez as "Azul"
 Jaime de Hoyos as "Bigotón"
 Edith Gonzalez as Electra
 Ramiro Gómez as The Waiter
 Jesús López Viejo as The Clerk
 Luis Baro as Dominó's Assistant
 Óscar Fabila as The Boy

Production
The film was shot in numerous locations in Ciudad Acuña, Coahuila, located in Northeastern Mexico adjacent to Del Rio, Texas. The film used 16 mm film and was shot in 14 days. Rodriguez had a $7,000 budget, almost half of which he raised by participating in experimental clinical drug testing while living in Austin, Texas. The opening scenes, featuring a shootout in a jail, were filmed at the local Acuña jail situated on the outskirts of the town. The female warden and the male guard were the real-life warden and guard; Rodriguez thought it was convenient because it saved him the cost of hiring actors and renting clothing. The intro bar scene was shot inside the Corona Club and exterior street scenes were shot on Hidalgo Street. The shootout was filmed outside at "Boy's Town", the local red-light district.

Not everyone in Acuña was pleased with the filming. Local journalists Ramiro Gómez and Jesús López Viejo were especially critical of the filming, and to win them over, Rodriguez gave them small parts in the film. Due to the high body count of the film, Rodriguez increasingly had difficulties finding adult men to play thugs, as dead characters obviously could not return; for that reason, when the Mariachi meets Moco's gang at the end of the film, the gang consists mainly of teenagers.

On the El Mariachi DVD, Rodriguez devotes both a DVD commentary and an "Extras" section to explaining the tricks of filming a feature-length film with just $7,000. Rodriguez heavily stresses the need for cost cutting, "because if you start to spend, you cannot stop anymore." This is why he cut costs at every possible opportunity. He did not use a slate; the actors, instead, signaled the number of scene and number of take with their fingers. He did not use a dolly, and instead held the camera while being pushed around in a wheelchair. He did not use synchronised sound; rather, he shot the film silent, then recorded on-set audio so it could be synced in post-production. Professional lighting was replaced by two 200-watt clip-on desk lamps. No film crew was hired; actors not in the scenes helped out instead. Rodriguez believed in filming scenes sequentially in one long take with a single camera; every few seconds, he froze the action, so he could change the camera angle and make it appear that he used multiple cameras simultaneously. Bloopers were kept in to save film: Rodriguez is visible on a bus with the Mariachi; the Mariachi bumps his weapon into a street pole; he fails to throw his guitar case on a balcony; and Dominó twitches her face when she is already dead. Rodriguez spared expense by shooting on 16 mm film as opposed to 35 mm, and transferred the film to video for editing, avoiding the costs of cutting on film. In the end, he used only 24 rolls of film and only spent $7,225 of the $9,000 he had planned.

Rodriguez gave insight into his low budget approach to simulate machine gun fire. The problem was that when using real guns, as opposed to the specially designed blank firing firearms used in most films, the blanks would jam the weapon after being fired once. To solve this, Rodriguez filmed the firing of one blank from different angles, dubbed canned machine gun sounds over it, and had the actors drop bullet shells to the ground to make it look like as if multiple rounds had been shot. In addition, he occasionally used water guns instead of real guns to save money. The squibs used in shootout scenes were simply condoms filled with fake blood and fixed over weightlifting belts.

Several aspects of the film were improvised. The tortoise that crawls in front of the Mariachi was not planned, but was kept in anyways. Similarly, there is a scene in which the Mariachi buys a coconut, but Rodriguez forgot to show him paying for the fruit; instead of driving back to the place to shoot additional scenes, Rodriguez decided to build in a voice-over in which the Mariachi asserts that the coconuts were for free. Improvisation was also useful to cover up continuity mistakes: at the end of the movie, the Mariachi has his left hand shot, but Rodriguez forgot to bring the metal glove to cover up the actor's hand; he solved it by packing his hand with black duct tape.

In the DVD commentary, Rodriguez describes the acting of Peter Marquardt who portrayed gangster boss Moco. As the language of the film was Spanish, which Marquardt did not master, he had to learn his lines without understanding what he was saying. The running gag, in which Moco lights up his match using the moustache of his henchman Bigotón, was described by Rodriguez as a means to start and end the film: the end scene is a parody of this scene. When Moco was hit in the chest in the final shooting, Marquardt's blood squib exploded with such force that he actually crumpled to the ground in pain.

Originally, the film was meant to be sold on the Latino video market as funding for another bigger and better project that Rodriguez was contemplating. However, after being rejected from various Latino straight-to-video distributors, Rodriguez decided to send his film (it was in the format of a trailer at the time) to bigger distribution companies where it started to get attention.

When the sequel Desperado was produced, Antonio Banderas replaced Gallardo as the actor for the main character of the series. The filmmakers re-shot the final showdown from El Mariachi as a flashback sequence for Banderas' character in Desperado.

Music
For the scene in which the Mariachi delivers a song in front of Dominó, Rodriguez hired Juan Francisco Suarez Vidaurri, a local entertainer. Recording the song with little more than a microphone held next to the musician, Rodriguez pitched the voice to match the voice of Mariachi actor Carlos Gallardo.

Book
The story of the film's production inspired Rodriguez to write the book Rebel Without a Crew: Or How a 23-Year-Old Filmmaker with $7,000 Became a Hollywood Player.

Television adaptation
Sony's AXN channel confirmed that it would air TV series adaptation called El Mariachi. The series premiered on March 20, 2014.

Reception

Critical reception

The film received universal critical acclaim. Review aggregator website Rotten Tomatoes shows a 91% score based on 75 reviews, and an average rating of 6.9/10. The site's consensus states: "Made on a shoestring budget, El Mariachi story is not new. However, the movie has so much energy that it's thoroughly enjoyable." Metacritic reports a 73 out of 100 rating based on 9 critics, indicating "generally favorable reviews".

Awards and honours
El Mariachi won multiple international awards, including the Independent Spirit Award for Best First Feature (beating out MTV Movie Award for Best Movie winner Menace II Society). Writer/producer/director Rodriguez went on to gain international fame; he was interviewed on such shows as Sábado Gigante and proceeded thereafter to secure Hollywood-backing for films such as The Faculty and Sin City. In December 2011, El Mariachi was deemed "culturally, historically, or aesthetically significant" by the United States Library of Congress and selected for preservation in the National Film Registry. Citing it as the film that "helped usher in the independent movie boom of the early 1990s", the Registry gave special mention to director Robert Rodriguez and his ability to merge two separate genres of films—"the narcotraficante film, a Mexican police genre, and the transnational warrior-action film, itself rooted in Hollywood Westerns"—successfully "despite the constraints of a shoestring budget."

References

Further reading

External links
 
 
 
 

Mexico Trilogy
1992 films
1990s action films
Mexican independent films
Films about Mexican Americans
Mexican Western (genre) films
Spanish-language American films
1992 independent films
1992 Western (genre) films
American independent films
American action films
American Western (genre) films
Films about Mexican drug cartels
Films about guitars and guitarists
Films directed by Robert Rodriguez
Films produced by Robert Rodriguez
Films produced by Elizabeth Avellán
Films set in Mexico 
Films shot in Mexico 
American gangster films
Gun fu films
Films with screenplays by Robert Rodriguez
Sundance Film Festival award winners
United States National Film Registry films
Troublemaker Studios films
1992 directorial debut films
Films shot in 16 mm film
1990s American films